The fauna of Italy comprises all the animal species inhabiting the territory of the Italian Republic and its surrounding waters. Italy has one the highest level of faunal biodiversity in Europe, with over 57,000 species recorded, representing more than a third of all European fauna. This is due to various factors. The Italian peninsula is in the center of the Mediterranean Sea, forming a corridor between central Europe and North Africa, and it has  of coastline. Italy also receives species from the Balkans, Eurasia, and the Middle East. Italy's varied geological structure, including the Alps and the Apennines, Central Italian woodlands, and Southern Italian Garigue and Maquis shrubland, also contribute to high climate and habitat diversity.

The fauna of Italy includes 4,777 endemic animal species, which include the Sardinian long-eared bat, Sardinian red deer, spectacled salamander, brown cave salamander, Italian newt, Italian frog, Apennine yellow-bellied toad, Italian wall lizard, Aeolian wall lizard, Sicilian wall lizard, Italian Aesculapian snake, and Sicilian pond turtle. In Italy there are 119 mammals species, 550 bird species, 69 reptile species, 39 amphibian species, 623 fish species and 56,213 invertebrate species, of which 37,303 insect species.

Biodiversity 

Italy is one of the richest European countries in both plant and animal biodiversity, with a population very rich in endemic forms. During the Pleistocene glaciations, the Italian territory remained largely free of ice, which allowed the flora and fauna to survive, something that did not happen in the central-northern areas of the continent, and the retreat of the great glaciers has left glacial relict fauna in some mountain locations.

The Italian territory extends over about 10° of latitude, therefore, while remaining in the context of temperate climates without extremes of heat, cold or aridity, the climatic difference between the north and the south of the country is not at all negligible, going from the nival climates of the Alpine peaks, to the cool semi-continental temperate climate of the Po Valley, to the Mediterranean climate of the central-southern coasts and the islands. Italy is predominantly hilly and mountainous in nature of the territory, which has caused a proliferation of ecological niches, close in space but very diversified.

Geography and climate 

Italy consists of a 1,000 km (620 miles) long peninsula extending out into the central Mediterranean, together with a number of islands to the south and west. The Apennines run north-south through the peninsula connecting the Alps in the north to Etna and the Peloritani mountains in Sicily in the south. The geology is diverse.

Northern Italy is dominated by the Alps and an extensive valley of the Po river which is extensively agricultural and industrialised. Central Italy includes the regions of Tuscany, Umbria, Marche and Lazio. It is dominated by the Apennines, from which a few major rivers flow. There are few natural plains. A process of land reclamation has replaced the coastal swamps and marshes with  agricultural land.

Southern Italy includes the regions of Abruzzo, Molise, Apulia, Basilicata and Campania. Agriculture and industry are less developed. The main islands are Sicily, Sardinia and the Aeolian Islands. 

Because of the length of the Italian peninsula and the mostly mountainous hinterland, the climate of Italy is highly diverse. In most of the inland northern and central regions, the climate ranges from humid subtropical to humid continental and oceanic. In particular, the climate of the Po valley geographical region is mostly continental, with harsh winters and hot summers. The coastal areas of Liguria, Tuscany and most of the South generally fit the Mediterranean climate stereotype (Köppen climate classification). Each region has a distinct fauna.

Ecoregions 

An ecoregion is an ecologically and geographically defined area with characteristic species. Most of the Italian territory is included in the Mediterranean Basin. Important Italian terrestrial ecoregions include the Illyrian deciduous forests, the Italian sclerophyllous and semi-deciduous forests, the South Apennine mixed montane forests, the Tyrrhenian-Adriatic sclerophyllous and mixed forests, Apennine deciduous montane forests, the Dinaric Mountains mixed forests and the Po Basin mixed forests. There are also many cave systems significant for biodiversity.

Endemic species 

The Checklist of the Species of the Italian Fauna includes 4,777 endemic animal species in Italy.

Unique mammals include the Corsican hare, the Sardinian long-eared bat, the Apennine shrew, the Udine shrew the Calabria pine vole, and the Sardinian deer.

Endemic amphibians and reptiles include the spectacled salamander, the Sardinian cave salamander, the Italian cave salamander, the Monte Albo cave salamander, the Sardinian brook newt, the Italian newt, the Italian frog, the Apennine yellow-bellied toad, the Sicilian green toad, the Aeolian wall lizard, the Sicilian wall lizard, the Italian Aesculapian snake, and the Sicilian pond turtle (Emys trinacris).

Endemic fishes include the Bergatino loach, the Italian barbel, the brook chub, the Arno goby, the Garda carp, the carpione del Fibreno, and the Timavo sculpin. Endemic birds include the Italian sparrow. There are 288 endemic species of lepidopterans in Italy. A notable species is the European owl moth found only in Southern Italy.

Vertebrates

Mammals 

There are 119 species of mammals in Italy. Some of the species are Alpine marmot, forest dormouse, Etruscan shrew (the smallest mammal in the world), European snow vole, and Schreiber's long-fingered bat. Notable large mammals are the Eurasian lynx, Italian wolf, Marsican brown bear, Pyrenean chamois, Alpine ibex, common genet, fallow deer, mouflon, rough-toothed dolphin, crested porcupine, and Mediterranean monk seal.

Birds 

Italy has recorded 550 bird species. Notable birds are the hoopoe, roller, white-backed woodpecker, black woodpecker, European green woodpecker, Alpine chough, snow finch, rock partridge, Bonelli's eagle, goshawk, eagle owl, lammergeier, Egyptian vulture, griffon vulture, collared pratincole, glossy ibis, spoonbill, Allen's gallinule, great bustard, trumpeter finch, rosy starling, great spotted cuckoo, woodchat shrike, bluethroat, and Eurasian nightjar.

Italy is an important route for trans-Saharan bird migrants, because it is a natural bridge connecting continental Europe to Africa across the Mediterranean. Migratory birds with a low wing loading, such as stork, European honey buzzard, black kite, marsh harrier, kestrel, and hobby, depend on thermals and updrafts for soaring to cross the Mediterranean in spring. Although the majority of these birds enter Europe via the Bosphorus or Straits of Gibraltar, large numbers leave at Cap Bon in Tunisia and enter Europe via the Aeolian Islands and the Straits of Messina to Calabria. Most of these birds breed in central and northern Europe. The birds return to Africa in autumn by the same route.

Reptiles

About 69 species of reptiles have been recorded in Italy. Notable reptiles are the Dice snake, the Green whip snake, the Aesculapian snake, the Smooth snake, the Montpellier snake, the European cat snake, the Walser viper, the Meadow viper, the Horned viper, the Common European adder, the Asp viper, the Hermann's tortoise, the European pond turtle, the Sicilian pond turtle, the Italian wall lizard, the European wall lizard and the European green lizard.

Amphibians

There are 39 species of amphibians in Italy (including introduced and naturalised species) in two orders, Anura and Caudata. No Caecilian is known to live in the country. Notable amphibians are the Italian tree frog, Agile frog, Italian stream frog, Italian edible frog, Common toad, Balearic green toad, Northern spectacled salamander, Spectacled salamander, Fire salamander, Smooth newt, Italian newt, Alpine newt and Italian crested newt

Fishes
Fish in Italy are diversified into 623 species. Of all the species present about one fifth live in fresh waters and of these 9 are endemic. Notable freshwater fishes are the Brook lamprey, Lombardy lamprey, Italian bleak, Horse barbel, Eurasian carp, European chub, Scardola scardafa, Tench, Northern pike, European perch, Lavaret and River trout.

Invertebrates 

The Italian fauna includes 56,213 species of invertebrates, of which 37,303 species of insects. Commonly seen insects in Italy are the sail swallowtail, the scarlet dragonfly, Cleopatra butterfly, European praying mantis, cicada, glow-worm, hummingbird hawk-moth, Italian stinkbug, firebug, field cricket, European hornet, cuckoo wasp, carpenter bee, and the rose chafer.

Marine fauna 

Characteristic habitat types of the Italian Mediterranean coastal zone are the Cystoseira biocenosis and the Posidonia oceanica seagrass beds, Lithophyllum lichenoides communities form coralligenous reefs which are a spectacular sight the coralline alga is covered with large gorgonian fans, coral, and a diverse array of often colorful invertebrate organisms and hundreds of species of fish.

These communities host sponges (Porifera), sea anemones and jellyfish (Cnidaria), sea mats and hornwrack (Bryozoa), segmented worms (Annelida), snails, bivalves, squids and octopuses (Mollusca), starfish and sea urchins (Echinodermata), crabs, lobsters and shrimps (Crustacea), and little known groups such as Echiura, Priapulida, Sipuncula, Brachiopoda, Pogonophora, Phoronida, and Hemichordata.

Amongst the thousand or so species of invertebrates found in the Italian marine environment are Squilla mantis, Mediterranean slipper lobsters, common octopus, common cuttlefish, scribbled nudibranch, Hypselodoris picta, tasselled nudibranch, Flabellina affinis, precious coral, zigzag coral, purple sail, Mediterranean jellyfish, spiny spider crab, circular crab, broad-clawed porcelain crab, noble pen shell, pilgrim’s scallop, ragged sea hare, violet sea hare, Portuguese man o' war, black sea-urchin, purple sea urchin, Mediterranean starfish, sea mouse, and Parazoanthus axinellae.

Strait of Messina 

The Tyrrhenian and Ionian meet in Straits of Messina, generating powerful currents and strong turbulence, aggravated by the abrupt changes of sea bottom topography in the vicinity of the town of Messina. As a consequence, many species known as rare in the Mediterranean are found in large numbers in the straits. It is common to find deep species at the surface and vice versa, or open-sea species along the coast. The upwelling water drags abyssal species to the surface and sometimes strands them on the shore. Made famous in the nineteenth century by the zoologists Nicholas Miklouho-Maclay and Anton Dohrn, the straits have an extraordinary abundance and structure of planktonic, benthic, and nektonic communities.

Introduced species 

The Italian fauna is rich in introduced species. Many introductions date from the time of the Roman Empire, such as the common carp.

Examples of more recent—and sometimes unwelcome—arrivals are the Asian tiger mosquito from Southeast Asia, the citrus long-horned beetle from China, the citrus pest cottony cushion scale, the pumpkinseed fish, the mosquitofish, the Louisiana crayfish, the zebra mussel, the strawberry finch, the Eastern grey squirrel, Finlayson's squirrel, and the coypu. Two introduced parrot species, the monk parakeet and the rose-ringed parakeet, are found in city parks.

Lessepsian migration 

Since the construction of the Suez Canal in 1869, invasive marine species originating from the Red Sea have become a major component of the Mediterranean ecosystem. Known as the Lessepsian migration, the introduced species have caused serious impacts on the Mediterranean ecology, endangering many local and endemic Mediterranean species. About 300 species native to the Red Sea have already been identified in the Mediterranean Sea, and there are probably others yet unidentified.

Conservation 

Italy is a signatory to the Berne Convention on the Conservation of European Wildlife and Natural Habitats and the Habitats Directive both affording protection to Italian fauna and flora. National parks cover about 5% of the country, while the total area protected by national parks, regional parks and nature reserves covers about 10.5% of the Italian territory, to which must be added 12% of coasts protected by marine protected areas.

Pleistocene fauna 

The Pleistocene large mammals of Italy were primarily Eurasian immigrants fleeing 
extreme cold further north. Typical species are:

 Cave bear, Ursus spelaeus
 European cave lion, Panthera leo spelaea
 European hippopotamus, Hippopotamus antiquus
 Neanderthal, Homo neanderthalensis
 Woolly mammoth, Mammuthus primigenius
 Mammuthus meridionalis
 Straight-tusked elephant, Elephas (Palaeoloxodon) antiquus
 Woolly rhinoceros, Coelodonta antiquitatis

Insular dwarfism 
Pleistocene dwarf elephants developed as a result of insular dwarfism on the island of Sardinia:

 Mammuthus lamarmorae (Major, 1883)
 Elephas antiquus (Acconci, 1881)
 Elephas melitensi (Caria, 1965))

On the islands of Sicily and Malta:

 Elephas (Palaeoloxodon) antiquus leonardii (Aguirre, 1969)
 Elephas (Palaeoloxodon) mnaidriensis (Adams, 1874)
 Elephas (Palaeoloxodon) melitensis (Falconer, 1868)
 Elephas (Palaeoloxodon) falconeri (Busk, 1867))

Other Pleistocene animals found on these islands are:

 Sardinian dhole, Cynotherium sardous
 Sicilian hippopotamus, Hippopotamus pentlandi 
 Sardinian dwarf mammoth, Mammuthus lamarmorae

Zoological museums 

Museums which contain important collections of the fauna of Italy and which have public galleries devoted to the Italian fauna are:
 Civico Museo di Storia Naturale di Trieste, Trieste
 La Specola, the Museum of Zoology and Natural History of Florence 
 
 Museo Civico di Storia Naturale di Milano, Milan
 Museo Civico di Storia Naturale Giacomo Doria, Genoa 
 Museo Civico di Zoologia di Roma, Rome
 , Rovereto
 Museo di Scienze Naturali Enrico Caffi, Bergamo
 Museo di Storia Naturale di Firenze, University of Florence, Florence
 Museo storia naturale di Pisa, Pisa
 , Trento
 Turin Museum of Natural History, Turin
 Zoological Museum of Naples, Naples
 Stazione Zoologica, Naples
 , Montevarchi
 , Verona.
 , Livorno
 Museo di storia naturale della Maremma, Grosseto

Zoological societies 
  (ENPA)
 Lega Italiana Protezione Uccelli (LIPU) 
 Unione Zoologica Italiana
 La Società Entomologica Italiana
 
 Italian Horse Protection Association
 Tethys Research Institute

See also 

 Flora of Italy
 Geography of Italy
 List of extinct and endangered species of Italy
 List of amphibians of Italy
 List of birds of Italy
 List of butterflies of Italy
 List of mammals of Italy
 List of moths of Italy
 List of non-marine molluscs of Italy
 List of reptiles of Italy
 List of snakes of Italy

References

Bibliography 
 
Latella L., 2007. I Musei di Storia Naturale e la gestione del territorio, l’esempio della CKmap e il Museo di Verona. Museologia scientifica (n.s.) 1: 149-151.
Latella L., 2011. Il ruolo dei Musei di Storia Naturale nello Studio, monitoraggio, conservazione e divulgazione della biodiversità. alcuni esempi italiani. In: Pignatti S. (ed.). Aree protette e ricerca scientifica. ETS edizioni, Pisa: 101-112.
 Minelli A., Ruffo S., La Posta S. (Eds), 1993-1995Checklist delle specie della Fauna d'Italia [Checklist of the species of the Italian Fauna] Calderini Ed., Bologna. The first complete inventory of the animal species of a whole country in  Europe.Records 57,422 species (56,168 invertebrates and 1,254 vertebrates). A collaboration between Nature Conservation Service and the Scientific Committee for the Fauna of Italy, Italian Zoological Union and the National Academy of Entomology. 272 specialists from 15 countries were involved in the project.Species are (uniquely) identified by numerical codes. The work is divided into 110 issues.
 Minelli A., 1996 La checklist delle specie della fauna italiana. Un bilancio del progetto. Bollettino Museo Civico Storia naturale Verona, 20: 249-261.
 Minelli A, Chemin, C., R. Winch & Ruffo S. Ruffo & S.2002 La fauna in Italia. The fauna in Italy. Touring Editore, Milano e Ministero dell'Ambiente e della Tutela del Territorio, Roma. Touring Editore, Milan and Ministry for the Environment and Territory, Rome. 448 pp.
 Sindaco, R., Doria, G., Razzetti, E. and Bernini, F. 2006 (eds) Atlas of Italian Amphibians and Reptiles\Atlante Degli Anfibi E Dei Rettili D'Italia Polistampa.
  Logozzo, D., Bassi, E., and Cocchi, L.. 2004. Crossing the sea en route to Africa: autumn migration of some Accipitriformes over two central Mediterranean Islands. Ring 26:71-78.
 Stoche, F., 2000 How many endemic species ? Species richness assessment and conservation priorities in Italy.Belgian Journal of Entomology, 2: 125-133.
 Stoche, F., 2004 Banche dati e distribuzione della fauna italiana: gli invertebrati. Quad. Cons. Natura, 18, Min. Ambiente Ist. Naz. Fauna Selvatica: 21-36.

External links 
  FaunaItalia
 Fauna Europaea 
 Wild Wonders of Europe Photo gallery
 biodiversityhotspots
  Amphibia Web 48 Species returned for Italy
 Fishbase Returns 585 species (incomplete)
 Living Treasures Italy
 entomologiitaliani Entomology Forum. Many images. In Italian
 naturamediterraneo Forum. Many images In Italian
 European Marine Life
 Marine Research in Medina
 EBN Where to watch birds in Rome
 Biographies of famous Italian Zoologists
 Mondo Marino Photogallery Marine life 375 photos from the Mediterranean
 Scricciolo Alberto Masi Ornithology Website
 WWF
 Federazione Nazionale Pro Natura In English and Italian
 Conchiglie del Mediterraneo
 AIAM Faunal index page (Major taxa)
 Ecoregions
 Protected areas
 Scarabeoidea of Italy

 
Biota of Italy